|}

The Brocklesby Stakes is a flat conditions race horse race in Great Britain open to horses aged two years. It is notable as the traditional opening two-year-old race of the British Flat racing season. It is run over five furlongs at Doncaster Racecourse.

History 
The Brocklesby was first run in 1849 as an all-age 12 furlong race at the now defunct Carholme racecourse in Lincoln, but became a five furlong race for two-year-olds in 1875.  It moved to Doncaster in 1965, where it appears on the same card as the Lincolnshire Handicap, also previously run at Carholme. Arguably the best horse to win the race was Donovan, in 1888. Donovan went on to win The Derby and the St Leger in 1889. Other top class horses to win the race have included Semolina, Deep Diver, Provideo, The Last Lion and Hearts of Fire.

Winners since 1988
 Separate divisions of the race indicated by (1) and (2).

See also
 Horse racing in Great Britain
 List of British flat horse races

References 

 Paris-Turf:

Racing Post

External links 
 Doncaster Racecourse
 Brocklesby Stakes Stars
 7 Brocklesby Stakes Winners You Will Never Forget

Flat races in Great Britain
Doncaster Racecourse
Flat horse races for two-year-olds
Recurring sporting events established in 1849
1849 establishments in England